European Volleyball Championship may refer to
 Men's European Volleyball Championship
 Women's European Volleyball Championship